Jure may refer to:

 De jure, Latin legal phrase
 Jure (given name), Slavic masculine name